John M. Dionisio leads AECOM (NYSE: ACM), an $8-billion global provider of professional technical and management support services, as chief executive officer from 2005 to 2011. He served as chairman of the company's board of directors from 2011 to 2014, becoming executive chairman in 2014. He earned a master of science degree in civil engineering from New York University Tandon School of Engineering (then Polytechnic Institute of New York).

References

External links
 AECOM Biography

American technology chief executives
1949 births
Living people
City College of New York alumni
Polytechnic Institute of New York University alumni